List of Metrobus routes may refer to:

 List of Metrobus routes (Miami-Dade County)
 List of Metrobus routes (Washington, D.C.)